The Percolozoa are a group of colourless, non-photosynthetic Excavata, including many that can transform between amoeboid, flagellate, and cyst stages.

Characteristics
Most Percolozoa are found as bacterivores in soil, fresh water and occasionally in the ocean. The only member of this group that is infectious to humans is Naegleria fowleri, the causative agent of the often fatal disease amoebic meningitis. The group is closely related to the Euglenozoa, and share with them the unusual characteristic of having mitochondria with discoid cristae.  The presence of a ventral feeding groove in the flagellate stage, as well as other features, suggests that they are part of the Excavata group.

The amoeboid stage is roughly cylindrical, typically around 20–40 μm in length.  They are traditionally considered lobose amoebae, but are not related to the others, and unlike them, do not form true lobose pseudopods.  Instead, they advance by eruptive waves, where hemispherical bulges appear from the front margin of the cell, which is clear.  The flagellate stage is slightly smaller, with two or four anterior flagella anterior to the feeding groove.

Usually, the amoeboid form is taken when food is plentiful, and the flagellate form is used for rapid locomotion.  However, not all members are able to assume both forms.  The genera Percolomonas, Lyromonas, and Psalteriomonas are known only as flagellates, while Vahlkampfia, Pseudovahlkampfia, and most acrasids do not have flagellate stages.  As mentioned above, under unfavourable conditions, the acrasids aggregate to form sporangia.  These are superficially similar to the sporangia of the dictyostelids, but the amoebae only aggregate as individuals or in small groups and do not die to form the stalk.

Terminology and classification
These are collectively referred to as schizopyrenids, amoeboflagellates, or vahlkampfids.  They also include the acrasids, a group of social amoebae that aggregate to form sporangia.  The entire group is usually called the Heterolobosea, but this may be restricted to members with amoeboid stages.

One Heterolobosea classification system is:
 Order Schizopyrenida
 Family Vahlkampfiidae
 Family Gruberellidae
 Order Acrasida
 Family Acrasidae
Pleurostomum flabellatum has recently been added to Heterolobosea.

Phylogeny
Based on the cladogram from Tolweb and updated by Pánek and Čepička 2014.

Taxonomy
Phylum Percolozoa Cavalier-Smith 1991
 Subphylum Pharyngomonada
 Class Pharyngomonadea [Macropharyngomonadidea]
 Order Pharyngomonadida [Macropharyngomonadida]
 Family Pharyngomonadidae Cavalier-Smith 2008 [Macropharyngomonadidae Cavalier-Smith 2008]
 Genus Pharyngomonas  Cavalier-Smith 2008 [Macropharyngomonas nomen nudum]
 Subphylum Tetramitia Cavalier-Smith 1993 emend. Cavalier-Smith 2008
 Genus ?Costiopsis Senn 1900
 Genus ?Hoehnmastix Skvortzov 1974
 Genus ?Planiosculum Szabados 1948
 Genus ?Protomyxomyces Cunningham 1881
 Genus ?Protonaegleria Michel & Raether 1985
 Genus ?Pseudovahlkampfia Sawyer 1980
 Genus ?Schizamoeba Davis 1926
 Genus ?Tetramastigamoeba Singh & Hanumaiah 1977
 Genus ?Trimastigamoeba Whitmore 1911
 Genus ?Wasielewskia Hartmann & Schuessler 1913
 Order ?Euhyperamoebida
 Family Euhyperamoebidae Goodkov & Seravin 1984 [Hyperamoebidae Goodkov, Seravin & Railkin 1982]
 Genus Euhyperamoeba Goodkov & Seravin 1984 [Hyperamoeba Goodkov, Seravin & Railkin 1982 non Alexeieff 1923]
 Order Selenaionida Hanousková, Táborský & Čepička 2018
 Family Selenaionidae Hanousková, Táborský & Čepička 2018
 Genus Selenaion koniopes Park, De Jonckheere & Simpson 2012
 Genus Dactylomonas Hanousková, Táborský & Čepička 2018
 Order Neovahlkampfiida
 Family Neovahlkampfiidae
 Genus Neovahlkampfia Brown & de Jonckheere 1999
 Class Lyromonadea Cavalier-Smith 1993
 Order Paravahlkampfiida
 Family Paravahlkampfiidae
 Genus Fumarolamoeba De Jonckheere, Murase & Opperdoes 2011
 Genus Paravahlkampfia Brown & de Jonckheere 1999
 Order Lyromonadida Cavalier-Smith 1993
 Family Lyromonadidae Cavalier-Smith 1993
 Genus Lyromonas Cavalier-Smith 1993
 Family Plaesiobystridae
 Genus Pernina El Kadiri, Joyon & Pussard 1992
 Genus Euplaesiobystra Park et al. 2009
 Genus Plaesiobystra
 Genus Heteramoeba Droop 1962
 Family Gruberellidae Page & Blanton 1985
 Genus Gruberella Page 1984 non Gruber 1889 non Corliss 1960
 Genus Vrihiamoeba Murase, Kawasak & Jonckheere 2010
 Genus Oramoeba
 Genus Stachyamoeba Page 1975
 Family Psalteriomonadidae Cavalier-Smith 1993
 Genus Pseudoharpagon Panek et al. 2012
 Genus Sawyeria O'Kelly et al. 2003
 Genus Psalteriomonas Broers et al. 1990
 Genus Pseudomastigamoeba
 Genus Harpagon Panek et al. 2012
 Genus Monopylocystis O'Kelly et al. 2003
 Class Heterolobosidea
 Order Acrasida Schröter 1886
 ?Genus Allovahlkampfia Walochnik & Mulec 2009
 ?Genus Solumitrus Wang et al. 2011
 Family Acrasidae Poche 1913
 Genus Acrasis van Tieghem 1880
 Genus Pocheina Loeblich & Tappan 1961
 Family ?Guttulinopsidae Olive 1970 [Guttulinidae Berl. 1888; Guttulinopsaceae]
 Genus Guttulina Cienkowski 1873 non D’Orbigny 1839
 Genus Guttulinopsis Olive 1901 
 Genus Rosculus Hawes 1963
 Order Schizopyrenida Singh 1952 s.s.
 Family Naegleriidae [Tulamoebidae Kirby et al. 2015]
 Genus Aurem Jhin & Park 2018
 Genus Pleurostomum Namyslowski 1913
 Genus Tulamoeba Park et al. 2009
 Genus Marinamoeba De Jonckheere et al. 2009
 Genus Willaertia de Jonckheere et al. 1984
 Genus Naegleria Aléxéieff 1912 [Trimastigamoeba Whitmore 1911; Didascalus Singh 1952]
 Family Vahlkampfiidae Jollos 1917 s.s. [Tetramitaceae]
 Genus Tetramitus Perty 1852 [Copromastix Aragao 1916; Adelphamoeba Napolitano, Wall & Ganz 1970, Learamoeba Sawyer et al. 1998, Paratetramitus Darbyshire, Page & Goodfellow 1976, Singhamoeba Sawyer, Nerad & Munson 1992; Schizopyrenus Singh 1952]
 Genus Vahlkampfia Chatton & LaLung-Bonnaire 1912
 Family Percolomonadidae Cavalier-Smith 1993 [Choanogasteraceae]
 Genus Percolomonas Fenchel & Patterson 1986 [Choanogaster Pochmann 1959]
 Family Barbeliidae Arndt 2023
 Genus Barbelia Arndt 2021 
 Genus Nonamonas Hohlfeld, Meyer & Arndt 2023 
 Family Lulidae Hohlfeld & Arndt 2023
 Genus Lula Arndt, Nitsche & Carduck 2021 
 Family Stephanopogonidae Corliss 1961
 Genus Stephanopogon Entz 1884

History
The Heterolobosea were first defined by Page and Blanton in 1985 as a class of amoebae, and so only included those forms with amoeboid stages.  Cavalier-Smith created the phylum Percolozoa for the extended group, together with the enigmatic flagellate Stephanopogon.

Cavalier-Smith maintained the Heterolobosea as a class for amoeboid forms. He has defined Percolozoa as "Heterolobosea plus Percolatea classis nov."

References

External links
 Tree of Life Heterolobosea

 
Bikont phyla
Taxa named by Thomas Cavalier-Smith